Boyacı (literally "painter") is a Turkish occupational surname and may refer to:

 Aysun Boyacı (born 1972), Turkish football player
 Hıjran Alı Boyacı (2005), Turkish football player 
 Sümeyye Boyacı (born 2003), Turkish Paralympic swimmer

See also
 Boyacı Mosque
 Boyacı, Bismil
 Boyacı, Mecitözü

References

Occupational surnames
Turkish-language surnames